James Donald Root (born October 2, 1971) is an American guitarist. He is one of two guitarists for heavy metal band Slipknot, in which he is designated #4, as well as the former lead guitarist for rock band Stone Sour.

Life and career 

Root began performing with the thrash metal band Atomic Opera  from Iowa in the early 1990s, not to be confused with the hard rock band Atomic Opera from Houston, Texas. Soon after they split up he went on to perform in bands such as DeadFront and Stone Sour; he joined the latter in 1995, and returned to it along with vocalist Corey Taylor during its revival in 2002. Prior to joining Slipknot, he worked as a screenprinter, waiter, and busboy.

He joined Slipknot in January 1999, replacing their original guitarist, Josh Brainard, who left the band during the recording of their self-titled album, reportedly after having fulfilled his recording duties. In fact, the only song Root recorded during the album's sessions was "Purity", the former being featured on the short-lived first pressing of Slipknot as well as the 10th Anniversary Edition, and the latter being its replacement. Despite this, the song has become a staple for most of the band's live performances. Slipknot vocalist Corey Taylor invited Root to join the band based on Taylor's past experiences working with him in Stone Sour.

Although filling in the spot of rhythm guitar in 1999, Root is considered to be one of the band's main songwriters and has written lead guitar parts for Slipknot's later albums particularly on All Hope is Gone and .5: The Gray Chapter. Of Slipknot's nine member lineup which lasted between 1999 to 2010, Root was the last to join the band. Root typically performed lead guitar in Stone Sour, although he sometimes played rhythm. He has spoken of both bands' guitar style as being twin guitar: "In both bands, I fulfill both roles. In Slipknot, Mick [Thomson] has some solos, and in Stone Sour, Josh [Rand] has some solos." During the recording of Stone Sour's Audio Secrecy, he and Rand recorded their parts simultaneously.

Outside Slipknot and Stone Sour, Root has appeared on Slipknot turntablist Sid Wilson's DJ Starscream album The New Leader and John 5's The Devil Knows My Name, for the song "Black Widow of La Porte", and also appeared on the Roadrunner United project, performing the solo and harmony guitars on "Tired 'N Lonely" from the project's album The All-Star Sessions. He also appeared on Jonathan Davis and the SFA's cover of Lil Wayne's "Got Money".

On May 17, 2014, Stone Sour released an official statement saying that Root was no longer a member of the band. Moments before their statement, Root told a fan on Instagram of his departure, explaining "Not my decision. Not happy about it." In interviews, Root accused the band of being financially motivated and pursuing a more commercial musical direction, but also observed that he "wasn't really happy in that band anymore". Corey Taylor noted that the split initially put a strain on his and Root's relationship, which nonetheless was mended through channelling their frustrations into new Slipknot material.
For 13 years, Root was involved in a highly publicized relationship with Cristina Scabbia, the lead singer of Italian nu-metal band Lacuna Coil.

Equipment 
In July 2007, Fender released the Jim Root Telecaster. Prior to his endorsement deal with Fender, Root had been seen using PRS, Jackson, Charvel, and Maverick electric guitars, and Guild and Martin acoustic guitars as well as a wide range of effect pedals and amplifiers. In a 2009 performance for Eurockeennes, and from 2010 to 2012, Jim used a Gibson Flying V.

In January 2010, a Jim Root Signature Fender Stratocaster was unveiled on the Fender website, similar to the one he has been seen using on stage, as of March 2009. In 2012, Orange announced a new signature Tiny Terror amp based on their Rockerverb 100, Root's main amp, called the "#4". Then, the Squier Telecaster signature model was released, similar to the first Fender Telecaster Jim Root signature. The white model comes with a black pickguard and the black model comes with a white pickguard. Both Squiers have a maple neck and rosewood fretboard (22 frets). Jim's signature Squiers do not contain EMG 81 and EMG 60, instead containing Covered Passive Humbucking Pickups (Neck and Bridge).

The Fender Jim Root Jazzmaster was unveiled at the 2014 NAMM show. It has the same specs as the Jim Root Stratocaster. It only comes in flat black with an ebony fretboard.

In 2016, Fender released a sandblasted version of Root's Jazzmaster with red and black grain. This model is not available for purchase but can be seen used in several of Root's instructional videos on YouTube (as part of "The Sound and the Story") and has occasionally been seen live.

While Root primarily uses Orange Rockerverb heads live, he has been known to use a variety of amplifiers in the studio, including a modified Bogner Uberschall and Mesa Boogie Mark IIC, the later of which has appeared on 2004's Vol 3: The Subliminal Verses and 2019's We Are Not Your Kind.

In the music video for Unsainted and a performance on Jimmy Kimmel Live! Root was seen using EMG Retroactive pickups, with EMG's Instagram account suggesting that they are working on a signature set for him. This was later confirmed on the EMG Facebook page announcing that the set would debut at NAMM 2020. EMG released the JR "Daemonum" signature set in early 2020.

On October 21, 2021, Root announced he was working on a signature model with Charvel guitars. His signature series is set to release in August 2022 for $1,499.99. Root later added that he remains a Fender signature artist, as Charvel is owned by Fender.

Discography 

Atomic Opera
1990: The Judgement

Deadfront
 1998: Nemesis

Slipknot
 1999: Slipknot ("Purity" only)
 1999: Welcome to Our Neighborhood
 2001: Iowa
 2002: Disasterpieces
 2004: Vol. 3: (The Subliminal Verses)
 2005: 9.0 Live
 2006: Voliminal: Inside the Nine
 2008: All Hope Is Gone
 2010: (sic)nesses
 2012: Antennas to Hell
 2014: .5: The Gray Chapter
 2019: We Are Not Your Kind
 2022: The End, So Far

Stone Sour
 2002: Stone Sour
 2006: Come What(ever) May
 2007: Live in Moscow
 2010: Audio Secrecy
 2012: Live in Brighton
 2012: House of Gold & Bones – Part 1
 2013: House of Gold & Bones – Part 2

Roadrunner United
 2005: The All-Stars Sessions

Other appearances
 2006: The New Leader (DJ Starscream)
 2007: The Devil Knows My Name (John 5)
 2008: Got Money (Jonathan Davis and the SFA)
 2008: Pay for It (The Son of a Clown Mix) (Mindless Self Indulgence)
 2009: A Song for Chi (Fieldy)

 Filmography 
 1999: Welcome to Our Neighborhood 2002: Disasterpieces 2002: Rollerball 2006: Voliminal: Inside the Nine 2008: Nine: The Making of "All Hope Is Gone" 2009: Of the (sic): Your Nightmares, Our Dreams 2010: (sic)nesses 2011: Goat 2013: Jim Root: The Sound and The Story 
 2016: Jim Root: The Sound and The Story: .5 The Gray Chapter 2017: Day of the Gusano: Live in Mexico 2018: Loud Krazy Love''

References

External links 

 Slipknot website
 Stone Sour website
 

1971 births
Alternative metal guitarists
Musicians from Las Vegas
Grammy Award winners
Living people
Roadrunner Records artists
Slipknot (band) members
Lead guitarists
Rhythm guitarists
Stone Sour members
Guitarists from Iowa
American male guitarists